Ambiorix (1946–1975) (also known as Ambiorix II to distinguish him from another Ambiorix [1940], also by Tourbillon) was a French Champion Two-Year-Old Thoroughbred racehorse who became a leading sire.

Pedigree
Bred by Marcel Boussac at his Haras de Fresnay-le-Buffard in Orne, he was sired by Tourbillon whom Ambiorix II would help make the Leading sire in France in 1948. Tourbillon was a son of Ksar, a two-time winner of the Prix de l'Arc de Triomphe and the Leading sire in France in 1931. The dam of Ambiorix II was Lavendula, a daughter of Pharos, the Leading sire in Great Britain & Ireland in 1931 and Leading sire in France in 1939. Ambiorix was a half-brother to Source Sucree (dam of Turn-To), Perfume II (dam of My Babu and Sayani), Singadula and Wild Lavender II.

Race record
Trained by Charles Semblat and ridden by Roger Poincelet, Ambiorix proved to be a better runner at races around 8-10 furlongs in distance rather than the European Classic distance of 12 furlongs or more.

In 1948 Ambiorix made three starts. He finished off the board in his racing debut in the French Prix de Chatou and then easily won the Selsey Stakes at Goodwood Racecourse in England. He followed this with a win in the most important race for two-year-olds in France, the Grand Criterium. His performances earned him the 1948 French Champion Two-Year-Old-Colt honors. Racing at age three in 1949, Ambiorix made four starts. Jockey Poincelet guided the colt to wins in the Prix Lupin at Longchamp Racecourse and the Prix Greffulhe at Saint-Cloud Racecourse, both of which were run at around ten furlongs. Ambiorix then earned seconds to Good Luck in the 1949 Prix du Jockey Club and to Val Drake in the Prix Hocquart.

Stud record
After Ambiorix retired from racing, Marcel Boussac believed that he would have more value as a sire in the United States where the vast majority of race distances suited his record best. He was then sold for US$250,000 to a syndicate led by Bull Hancock, who brought him to stand at stud in time for the 1950 season at his Claiborne Farm near Paris, Kentucky.

Ambiorix spent the rest of his life at Claiborne Farm, where he sired fifty-one stakes race winners and was the Leading sire in North America in 1961. His best offspring included:
 High Voltage (1952) - American Champion Two-Year-Old Filly, won Matron Stakes, Coaching Club American Oaks
 Hitting Away (1958) - won Withers Stakes, Dwyer Stakes, Bernard Baruch Handicap, Royal Palm Handicap (2x)
 Ambiopoise (1958) - won Jersey Derby, Gotham Stakes, Discovery Handicap, sire of Faraway Son  
 Count Amber (1957) - won Narragansett Special, sire of Amberoid
 Amber Morn (1956) - won Bowling Green Handicap, Autumn Handicap, sire of Queen's Plate winners Royal Chocolate and Amber Herod
 Make Sail, winner of the Kentucky Oaks.

Through his daughter Fantan II, Ambiorix was the damsire of Ragusa, who was a major factor in him earning Leading broodmare sire in Great Britain & Ireland honors in 1963.

After being pensioned, Ambiorix died at age twenty-nine in January 1975 at Claiborne Farm and is buried the farm's equine cemetery.

Pedigree

References

 Profile of Ambiorix at Thoroughbred Heritage

External links
 Ambiorix's pedigree and partial racing stats

1946 racehorse births
1975 racehorse deaths
Racehorses bred in Orne
Racehorses trained in France
United States Champion Thoroughbred Sires
British Champion Thoroughbred broodmare sires
Thoroughbred family 1-w
Byerley Turk sire line